Serious Swingers is an album by saxophonists Bud Shank and Bill Perkins recorded in 1986 and released on the Contemporary label.

Reception

Scott Yanow, writing for AllMusic stated: "the co-leaders are in excellent form on six underplayed standards and three group originals. The music swings hard without being overly predictable".

Track listing
 "Nictation" (Alan Broadbent) - 4:47
 "As Sure as You're Born" (Alan Bergman, Johnny Mandel) - 6:49
 "Blue in Green" (Miles Davis) - 6:46 		
 "Out of This World" (Harold Arlen, Johnny Mercer) - 7:47
 "Blazing Paddles" (Bud Shank) - 4:20
 "Nu Blues for B B" (Bill Perkins) - 4:02
 "C.T.A." (Jimmy Heath) - 5:10
 "Don't Explain" (Billie Holiday, Arthur Herzog, Jr.) - 5:02
 "Remember" (Irving Berlin) - 5:21 		
 "Brazil" (Ary Barroso) - 8:13  Bonus track on CD

Personnel
Bud Shank - alto saxophone
Bill Perkins - tenor saxophone
Alan Broadbent - piano
John Heard - bass
Sherman Ferguson - drums

References

1987 albums
Contemporary Records albums
Bud Shank albums
Bill Perkins (saxophonist) albums